David Vázquez Bardera (born 21 March 1986) is a Spanish footballer who plays as a midfielder.

Football career
Vázquez was born in Madrid. A local Real Madrid youth graduate, he made his professional debuts in 2007–08, playing for the reserves in the third division and going on to appear in a further two seasons with them in that level.

In mid-August 2010, Vázquez signed for another team in division three, UD Melilla. With his following club, SD Huesca, he made his professional debut in the second tier on 5 November 2011, playing the second half of a 1–2 away loss against UD Almería; he scored his first goal in the competition on 24 March of the following year, to help to a 1–1 home draw to Celta de Vigo.

On 28 May 2014, Vázquez moved abroad for the first time, signing for Veria F.C. in the Superleague Greece. The following campaign, he returned to his country, its third division and Melilla.

Club statistics

References

External links

1986 births
Living people
Footballers from Madrid
Spanish footballers
Association football midfielders
Segunda División players
Segunda División B players
Tercera División players
Real Madrid C footballers
Real Madrid Castilla footballers
UD Melilla footballers
SD Huesca footballers
Super League Greece players
Veria F.C. players
Spanish expatriate footballers
Expatriate footballers in Greece